The Illinois Waterway system consists of  of navigable water from the mouth of the Calumet River at Chicago to the mouth of the Illinois River at Grafton, Illinois. Based primarily on the Illinois River, it is a system of rivers, lakes, and canals that provide a shipping connection from the Great Lakes to the Gulf of Mexico via the Illinois and Mississippi rivers.

The Illinois and Michigan Canal (I&M) opened in 1848. In 1900, the Chicago Sanitary and Ship Canal replaced the I&M and reversed the flow of the Chicago River so it no longer flowed into Lake Michigan. The United States Army Corps of Engineers maintains a  navigation channel in the waterway.  The waterway's complex northern section is referred to in various contexts for study and management as the Chicago Area Waterway System (CAWS).

Cargoes include bulk commodities, such as coal, chemicals, and petroleum, as well as corn, soybeans and other agricultural products. During some winters, ice floes, especially around the locks and dams, occasionally prevent navigation on the Waterway.

Locks and dams 

A series of eight locks, managed by the Army Corps of Engineers, controls water flow from Lake Michigan to the Mississippi River system.

The amount of water released into the Illinois often is a sore point among lake and river interests. When Lake Michigan water levels are high, lake interests want to increase the flow, and when lake levels are low, they want to restrict the flow. That is why an international treaty regulates the flow, as Canada also has an interest in Lake Michigan levels, which eventually flow into Lakes Huron, Erie and Ontario.

Schematic 

The eight locks and dams (L&D) on the waterway provide the lift for traffic along the waterway.

References 

US Army Corps of Engineers Illinois Waterway Fact Sheet (Dead link)

Further reading 
 Hay, Jerry (2009). Illinois Waterway Guidebook, 1st Edition,

External links 
U.S. Army Corps of Engineers - Illinois Waterway (Official site)

Historic American Engineering Record in Illinois
Illinois waterways